Gösta Törner (October 27, 1912, Stockholm - November 11, 1982, Stockholm) was a Swedish jazz trumpeter and bandleader. He was one of the first musicians to play hot jazz in Sweden, and worked extensively both as a session musician on recordings and with his own groups on Swedish national radio from the 1940s to the 1960s.

References

Swedish jazz bandleaders
Swedish jazz trumpeters
Male trumpeters
1912 births
1982 deaths
Musicians from Stockholm
20th-century trumpeters
20th-century Swedish male musicians
20th-century Swedish musicians
Male jazz musicians